Karl Marx City is a 2017 German documentary film, written, produced and directed by Michael Tucker and Petra Epperlein. The film was premiered at the 2016 Toronto International Film Festival.

Synopsis
After her father commits suicide in 1999, filmmaker Petra Epperlein journeys through the former East Germany in search of answers.

Cast
Christa Epperlein
Douglas Selvage
Hubertus Knabe
Petra Epperlein
Udo Grashoff
Uwe Epperlein
Volker Epperlein

Reception
On review aggregator website Rotten Tomatoes the film has an approval rating of 96% based on 26 critics, with an average rating of 8/10. On Metacritic, Karl Marx City has an above average score of 73 out of a 100 based on 10 critics, indicating "generally favorable reviews".

A.O. Scott of The New York Times called the documentary "unsettling" and added that "[it] is a smart, highly personal addition to the growing syllabus of distressingly relevant cautionary political tales".

Scott Tobias of Variety has compared the film's atmosphere to the one of today.

Stephen Dalton of The Hollywood Reporter, following the film's screening at Toronto International Film Festival, wrote: "a key joy of Karl Marx City is its strong, arty aesthetic".

Slant Magazines Jake Cole said that the lead heroine (Petra Epperlein), "[who have] personal ties to the subject matter[,] provides the documentary with a necessary anchor point".

Ella Taylor of NPR wrote that "[the film] suffers now and then from the same breathy tendency to overdramatize already incendiary material that marred Epperlein and Tucker's 2005 Iraq doc[umentary] Gunner Palace.

References

External links

2017 documentary films
German documentary films
2010s German films